Sripathi Panditaradhyula Balasubrahmanyam (4 June 1946 – 25 September 2020), also referred to as SPB or SP Balu or Balu, was an Indian playback singer, television presenter, actor, music composer, dubbing artist, and film producer. He is widely regarded as one of the greatest Indian singers of all time. He predominently worked in Telugu, Tamil, Kannada, Malayalam, and Hindi films and sang in a total of 16 languages.

S. P. Balasubrahmanyam debuted as a playback singer on 15 December 1966 with the Telugu film Sri Sri Sri Maryada Ramanna scored by his mentor, S. P. Kodandapani. In career spanning over five decades, he has won six National Film Awards for Best Male Playback Singer for his works in four different languages – Telugu, Tamil, Kannada, and Hindi; 25 Andhra Pradesh state Nandi Awards for his work in Telugu cinema; and numerous other state awards from Karnataka and Tamil Nadu governments. In addition, he won six Filmfare Awards South and a Filmfare Award. According to some sources, he held the Guinness World Record for recording the highest number of songs by a singer with over 50,000 songs in 16 languages. On 8 February 1981, he created a record by recording 27 songs in Kannada from 9 am to 9 pm. In addition, he recorded 19 songs in Tamil, and 16 songs in Hindi in a day, which has also been called a record.

In 2012, he received the state NTR National Award for his contributions to Indian cinema. In 2015, he received the Harivarasanam Award from the Government of Kerala. In 2016, he was honoured with the Indian Film Personality of the Year award at the 47th International Film Festival of India. He was a recipient of the Padma Shri (2001), Padma Bhushan (2011), and Padma Vibhushan (posthumously) (2021) from the Government of India.

On 25 September 2020, S. P. Balasubrahmanyam died in Chennai after being hospitalized for over a month for complications due to COVID-19.

Early life and background 

Balasubrahmanyam was born in Nellore, in present-day Andhra Pradesh into a Telugu Brahmin family. His father, S. P. Sambamurthy, was a Harikatha artist who also acted in plays. His mother was Sakunthalamma, who died on 4 February 2019. He had two brothers and five sisters, including singer S. P. Sailaja. His son S. P. Charan is also a popular South Indian singer, actor and producer.

Balasubrahmanyam developed an interest in music at an early age, studied musical notations and learned music. He enrolled at the JNTU College of Engineering Anantapur with the intention of becoming an engineer. He often said that, at the time his only dream was to fulfil his father's ambition and become an engineer and get a government job.

Balasubrahmanyam continued to pursue music during his engineering studies and won awards at singing competitions. He discontinued his studies early due to typhoid and joined as an associate member of the Institution of Engineers, Chennai. In 1964, he won the first prize in a music competition for amateur singers organized by the Madras-based Telugu Cultural Organization.

He was the leader of a light music troupe composed of Anirutta (on the harmonium), Ilaiyaraaja (on guitar and later on harmonium), Baskar (on percussion) and Gangai Amaran (on guitar). He was selected as the best singer in a singing competition which was judged by S. P. Kodandapani and Ghantasala. Often visiting music composers seeking opportunities, his first audition song was "Nilave Ennidam Nerungadhe". It was rendered by veteran playback singer P. B. Sreenivas, who used to write and give him multi-lingual verses in Telugu, Tamil, Hindi, Kannada, Malayalam, Sanskrit, English and Urdu.

Music career

1960s–1970s 

Balasubrahmanyam debuted as a playback singer on 15 December 1966 with the song 'Emiyee Vinta Moham' for Sri Sri Sri Maryada Ramanna, a Telugu film scored by his mentor, S. P. Kodandapani. The first non-Telugu song that he recorded just eight days after his debut Telugu song was in Kannada in 1966 for the film Nakkare Ade Swarga, starring Kannada comedy stalwart T. R. Narasimharaju. He recorded his first Tamil song "Athaanodu Ippadi Irundhu Eththanai Naalaachu", a duet with L. R. Eswari under the musical direction of M. S. Viswanathan for the film Hotel Ramba, which never released. The song "Medante Meda Kaadu" from the film Sukha Dukhalu (1968) composed by Kondandapani brought him recognition in Telugu cinema.

Other early songs he sang were duets with P. Susheela, "Iyarkai Ennum Ilaya Kanni" in the 1969 film Shanti Nilayam, starring Gemini Ganesh, and "Aayiram Nilavae Vaa" for M. G. Ramachandran in Adimaippenn. His first song with S. Janaki was "Pournami Nilavil Pani Vizhum Iravil" in Kannippenn. He was then introduced to the Malayalam film industry by G. Devarajan in the film Kadalppalam. As per Balasubrahmanyam, "Ye Divilo Virisina Parijathamo" from the 1973 Telugu film Kannevayasu composed by Satyam gave an amazing turning point to his singing career.

Balasubrahmanyam had the distinction of rendering the most songs on a single day by any singer. He had recorded 21 songs in Kannada for the composer Upendra Kumar in Bangalore from 9:00 am to 9:00 pm on 8 February 1981 and 19 songs in Tamil, 16 songs in Hindi in a day. In his words, "There were days when I used to record 15–20 songs, but only for Anand Milind. And I would take the last flight back to Chennai." In the 1970s, he also worked with M. S. Viswanathan in Tamil movies for actors such as M. G. Ramachandran, Sivaji Ganesan and Gemini Ganesan. He recorded duets with P. Susheela, S. Janaki, Vani Jayaram and L. R. Eswari. Balasubrahmanyam's association with Ilaiyaraaja began even before Ilaiyaraaja came to the cine field. In the early days, he used to sing in towns and villages all over south India and Ilaiyaraaja, then an unknown harmonium and guitar player accompanied him in his concerts.

1980s 
Balasubrahmanyam came to international prominence with the 1980 film Sankarabharanam. The film is considered to be one of the best films ever to emerge from the Telugu film industry. Directed by K. Viswanath, the film's soundtrack was composed by K. V. Mahadevan and led to an increase in the usage of Carnatic music in Telugu cinema as well as in other languages. Not a classically trained singer, he used a "film music" aesthetic in recording the songs. Balasubrahmanyam received his first National Film Award for Best Male Playback Singer for his work. His first work in Hindi films was in the following year, in Ek Duuje Ke Liye (1981), for which he received another National Film Award for Best Male Playback Singer.

Balasubrahmanyam began to record more songs in Telugu and other South Indian languages, especially for Ilaiyaraaja with S. Janaki, the trio considered to be highly successful in the Tamil film industry from the late 1970s and throughout the 1980s. The songs were based on classical music, such as in Saagara Sangamam (1983) and Rudraveena (1988), for which both Ilaiyaraaja and Balasubrahmanyam won National Awards for Best Music Director and Best Male Playback Singer respectively. South Indian actor Chiranjeevi admits that '''SPB''' voice is one of the main reasons of his success.

In 1989, Balasubrahmanyam was the playback singer for actor Salman Khan in the blockbuster Maine Pyar Kiya. The soundtrack for the film was very successful and he won a Filmfare Award for Best Male Playback Singer for the song Dil Deewana. For much of the next decade, Balasubrahmanyam continued as the "romantic singing voice" on the soundtracks of Khan's films. Notable among these was Hum Aapke Hain Koun..! which became the highest-grossing Hindi film of all time. Balasubrahmanyam's duet with Lata Mangeshkar, "Didi Tera Devar Deewana", was very popular. This solidified Balasubrahmanyam as one of the biggest playback singers in India. SP Balasubrahmanyam became identified as Salman Khan's voice in the 90s just like Kishore Kumar became Rajesh Khanna's voice through the 70s.

1990s 

In the 1990s, he worked with composers such as Vidyasagar, M. M. Keeravani, Hamsalekha, S. A. Rajkumar and Deva among others, but his association with A.R.Rahman turned out be a major success.

Balasubrahmanyam recorded three songs for A. R. Rahman in the latter's debut film Roja. He had a long-time association with Rahman right from Roja. Other popular songs include "July Maadham" from Pudhiya Mugam, which also marked the debut of singer Anupama, "Mannoothu Manthayilae" from Kizhakku Cheemayile which was a folk number and he almost sang all songs in the musical love story Duet and "Thanga Thaamarai" from Minsara Kanavu which fetched him, the sixth and latest of his National Film Awards for Best Male Playback Singer to date.

Balasubrahmanyam's association with Hamsalekha began after the latter's successful venture Premaloka in Kannada. Balasubrahmanyam sang the most songs for Hamsalekha in Kannada. He received his fourth National Film Award for Best Male Playback Singer for the song "Umandu Ghumandu" from the Kannada film Ganayogi Panchakshari Gavayi (1995), which was a Hindustani classical music-based composition by Hamsalekha.

2000–2020 

In 2013, Balasubrahmanyam recorded the title song for Chennai Express, singing for the lead actor Shah Rukh Khan, under the music direction of Vishal–Shekhar, breaking his 15-year hiatus from Hindi cinema music.

SPB is the only singer having a long spanning career of 54 years having at least two songs to record per day, even in his last days.

In May 2020, SPB crooned a song on humanity titled "Bharath Bhoomi" which was composed by Ilaiyaraaja as a tribute to the people such as police, doctors, nurses and janitors who have been significantly working amid COVID-19 pandemic. The video song was officially unveiled by Ilaiyaraaja through his official YouTube account on 30 May 2020 in both Tamil and Hindi languages.

Other work

Voice acting 
Balasubrahmanyam accidentally became a dubbing artist with K. Balachander's film Manmadha Leela (1976), the dubbed Telugu version of Manmadha Leelai, providing voice-over for Kamal Haasan. He has also provided voice-overs for various artists, including Kamal Haasan, Rajinikanth, Vishnuvardhan, Salman Khan, K. Bhagyaraj, Mohan, Anil Kapoor, Girish Karnad, Gemini Ganesan, Arjun Sarja, Nagesh, Karthik and Raghuvaran in various languages. He was assigned as the default dubbing artist for Kamal Haasan in Telugu-dubbed versions of Tamil films. For the Telugu version of Dasavathaaram, he gave voice to seven characters (including the female character) out of ten characters played by Kamal Haasan. He was awarded the Nandi Award for Best Male Dubbing Artist for the films Annamayya and Sri Sai Mahima. He dubbed for Nandamuri Balakrishna for the Tamil version of the movie Sri Rama Rajyam in 2012. He also dubbed for Ben Kingsley in the Telugu-dubbed version of Gandhi.

Television shows and films 

Balasubrahmanyam hosted and judged Telugu musical reality TV show Padutha Theeyaga, which marked his television debut. Starting from 1996, the show is credited for unearthing singing talents from Andhra Pradesh and Telangana. Singers like Usha, Kousalya, Gopika Poornima, Mallikarjun, Hemachandra, N. C. Karunya, Smita etc., have debuted in the show. He also hosted and judged Kannada musical reality TV show Ede Thumbi Haaduvenu. Balasubrahmanyam also appeared in other shows such as Paadalani Undi, Endaro Mahanubahvulu and Swarabhishekam.

Personal life 
Balasubrahmanyam was married in 1969 to Savithri and has two children, a daughter Pallavi, and a son S. P. Charan, also a playback singer and film producer.

Balasubrahmanyam considered S. P. Kodandapani, who gave him his first singing offer and mentored him in his early career, to be his guru. He would reminisce about him throughout his life and would often pay tributes to him. He named his recording theatre after him. He also named his film production company after him as 'Sri Kodandapani Film Circuits'.

Illness and death 
On 5 August 2020, Balasubrahmanyam tested positive for COVID-19 during the COVID-19 pandemic in India and was admitted to MGM Healthcare in Chennai. Subsequently, his health deteriorated and he was shifted to the intensive care unit in a critical state. He required a ventilator and extracorporeal membrane oxygenation (ECMO) support. It is stated that it was due to his age (74 years) and multiple comorbidities he had (like diabetes) that his condition worsened. His son Charan provided periodic updates over social media, while members of the Tamil film industry engaged in a mass prayer via Zoom on 20 August and candlelight vigils were held by fans outside the hospital. Similarly many actors of Telugu film industry urged people to pray for his life, many Tollywood music composers also organised virtual mass prayers. Members of the Kannada film industry got together for another mass prayer on 4 September 2020 in Bengaluru. On 7 September 2020, Balasubrahmanyam tested negative for the coronavirus, although he remained using a ventilator and ECMO. He started showing signs of recovery, including light speech and physical activities. However, the hospital released a statement on 24 September stating that he became "extremely critical" and was on "maximal life support".

Balasubrahmanyam died on 25 September 2020 at 1:04 pm (IST) of cardio-respiratory arrest after over a month-long hospitalisation. He was buried at his farm house in Thamaraipaakkam, Thiruvallur district with state honours on 26 September 2020.

Awards and nominations 

Throughout his career, Balasubrahmanyam has won awards not only for playback singing, but also for music direction, acting, dubbing and producing.

References

External links 

 
 
 
 

 
1946 births
2020 deaths
Male actors in Telugu cinema
Telugu playback singers
Male actors from Andhra Pradesh
Singers from Andhra Pradesh
Telugu film score composers
People from Nellore district
Telugu male actors
Deaths from the COVID-19 pandemic in India
Bhajan singers
Bollywood playback singers
Indian male film actors
Male actors in Tamil cinema
Male actors in Kannada cinema
Indian male voice actors
Indian male singers
Indian male playback singers
Kannada playback singers
Tamil playback singers
Recipients of the Padma Shri in arts
Malayalam playback singers
Recipients of the Padma Bhushan in arts
Tamil film score composers
Kannada film score composers
Filmfare Awards winners
Filmfare Awards South winners
Nandi Award winners
Film musicians from Andhra Pradesh
Tamil Nadu State Film Awards winners
Indian television presenters
20th-century Indian male actors
21st-century Indian male actors
20th-century Indian singers
21st-century Indian singers
20th-century Indian composers
21st-century Indian composers
Best Male Playback Singer National Film Award winners
Recipients of the Rajyotsava Award 2008
Male film score composers
Recipients of the Padma Vibhushan in arts
Sanskrit-language singers
South Indian International Movie Awards winners
People from Nellore